Old Stone Fort may refer to:

An Old Stone Fort located in Schoharie, New York.
The Old Stone Fort, an ancient Native American structure near Manchester, Tennessee.
Old Stone Fort, an old fort in Massachusetts
Old Stone Fort Museum located on the campus of Stephen F. Austin State University, Nacogdoches, Texas
Old Stone Fort (Coshocton, Ohio), possibly the oldest surviving building in the state of Ohio. Allegedly built by French in 1679.